Neruda Volley is an Italian women's volleyball club based in Bronzolo, it played in the Serie A1 until 2017 and is currently playing in the Serie B1.

Previous names
Due to sponsorship, the club have competed under the following names:
 Neruda Volley Bolzano (1978–2013)
 Volksbank Südtirol Bolzano (2013–2015)
 Südtirol Bolzano (2015–present)

History
Founded in 1978 as a cultural club dedicated to Pablo Neruda, volleyball become one of the club's activities in the early 1980s as youth teams began to compete in the regional leagues. The team did well achieving promotions but for financial reasons it declined competing at the higher national leagues. That changed in 2008 when Rudy Favretto became its president with a project to bring the club to the forefront of Italian volleyball. Personnel with experience at the Italian national youth teams were brought into the club and in 2012, the club acquired a licence to play in the Serie B1 from Pallavolo Vigevano. After playoffs and repechage the club gain promotion to the Serie A2 in 2013 and moved to the PalaResia.

The club reached the Serie A1 in 2015. Ahead of the 2017–18 season, the club announced it would not participate in Serie A1, due to lack of financial resources. The club was confirmed to play the Serie B1 in 2017–18.

Team
This was the last team which played in the Serie A1, Season 2016–2017, as of February 2017.

References

External links
 Official website 

Italian women's volleyball clubs
Volleyball clubs established in 1978
1978 establishments in Italy
Bolzano
Sport in South Tyrol
Serie A1 (women's volleyball) clubs